Kurt Schneider (1887–1967) was a German psychiatrist.

Kurt Schneider may also refer to:

 Kurt Schneider (athlete) (1900–1988), German athlete
 Kurt Schneider (aviator) (1888–1917), German World War I flying ace
 Kurt Schneider (cyclist) (born 1932), Austrian cyclist
 Kurt Fritz Schneider (1902–1985), German circus performer in USA
 Kurt Hugo Schneider (born 1988), also known as KHS, American film director, producer, singer and songwriter